Speak It! From the Heart of Black Nova Scotia is a 1992 documentary film by Sylvia Hamilton, focusing on a group of Black Nova Scotian students in a predominantly white high school, St. Patrick's in Halifax, Nova Scotia, who face daily reminders of racism. These students work to build pride and self-esteem through educational and cultural programs, discovering their heritage and learning ways to effect change. Produced by the National Film Board of Canada, this 28-minute documentary received the Canada Award at the 1994 Gemini Awards from the Academy of Canadian Cinema and Television, as well as the 1994 Maeda Prize from NHK.

References

External links
Watch Speak It! From the Heart of Black Nova Scotia at NFB.ca

1992 short films
1992 films
Documentary films about Black Canadians
National Film Board of Canada documentaries
Canadian short documentary films
Films set in Nova Scotia
Documentary films about racism in Canada
Culture of Halifax, Nova Scotia
Canada Award-winning shows
History of Black people in Canada
Anti-black racism in Canada
Films shot in Halifax, Nova Scotia
National Film Board of Canada short films
1990s English-language films
1990s Canadian films